The Nwanedi River is a watercourse in Limpopo Province, South Africa. It is a tributary of the Limpopo River flowing east of the Nzhelele, joining the right bank of the Limpopo 58 km east of Musina at the South Africa/Zimbabwe border.

Course
The Nwanedi river collects part of the drainage of the northern slopes of the extensive rock formation of the Soutpansberg. The upper Nwanedi is a perennial stream with twin dams where it is met by its tributary, the Luphephe River, in a wooded area of the range. Leaving the mountainous Soutpansberg area, it meanders in a northeastward direction across the Lowveld. This lower part is subject to seasonal fluctuations, being mostly dry during periods of drought, with a few disconnected ponds in the riverbed. There have been problems of surface water contamination of the river in the recent past.

The Luphephe River, its main tributary, rises also in the Soutpansberg, further east from the sources of the Nwanedi.

The Nwanedi Provincial Park is located about 35 km north of Thohoyandou, in a wooded area on the foothills of the Soutpansberg. The protected area includes the confluence of the Nwanedi and its main tributary, the Luphephe River, where the dams are. The park's area is 11,170 ha and it is well stocked with game.

The Nwanedi river should not be confused with the Nwanedzi, or Nwanedsi River a tributary of the Letaba River.

Dams in the basin
Cross Dam
Nwanedi Dam
Luphephe Dam, in the Luphephe River, a tributary of the Nwanedi

See also
Drainage basin A
Limpopo Water Management Area
 List of rivers of South Africa
Nwanedi Provincial Park

References

External links
Sites - Important Bird Areas (IBAs) - Soutpansberg
Limpopo WMA1
Another fish on its way to extinction?
Spectres of hunger, cholera start haunting S. Africa

Rivers of Limpopo
Tributaries of the Limpopo River